Markovskoye is a rural locality (a village) and the administrative center of Pelshemskoye Rural Settlement, Sokolsky District, Vologda Oblast, Russia. The population was 505 as of 2002. There are 7 streets.

Geography 
Markovskoye is located 34 km east of Sokol (the district's administrative centre) by road. Mikhalevo is the nearest rural locality.

References 

Rural localities in Sokolsky District, Vologda Oblast